Keiretsu Forum, which was founded in 2000 by Randy Williams, is a private group of international members comprising an angel investor network. The network has 53 chapters in cities such as San Francisco California, Seattle Washington, New York City, Paris France, Istanbul Turkey, and Chennai in India.

Investor Capital Expo

In 2008, Williams started the Keiretsu Forum Investor Capital Expo, which brings together angel investors and entrepreneurs looking for funding, and which takes place every year in Silicon Valley/San Francisco for the Northern California Investor Capital Expo, Investor Capital Expos have been hosted in cities including: Stockholm, Seattle, Sydney, Toronto, Prague, Chicago, and Philadelphia.

Referral Fees Controversy

Keiretsu Forum operates using a referral model that charges entrepreneurs and startups significant fees for the opportunity to pitch to the network members, a practice that is strongly discouraged in Angel Capital Association guidelines.  In 2009, tech investor and author Jason Calacanis criticized several investor networks, including Keiretsu, as operating pay to play schemes. He also established Open Angel Forum as an alternative investor network that doesn't charge fees. Williams subsequently clarified Keiretsu's policy of waiving fees for startup companies that have limited capital and no revenue.

References

External links 
 Keiretsu Forum - official website
 (http://www.investorcapitalexpo.net Investor Capital Expo - official website)

Angel investors
Organizations established in 2000